Lindsay Russell Robinson (19 November 1928 – 25 November 2004) was an Australian rules footballer who played with Melbourne in the Victorian Football League (VFL).

Notes

External links 

		
		
		
		
1928 births
2004 deaths
Australian rules footballers from Victoria (Australia)		
Melbourne Football Club players
Eaglehawk Football Club players